Hemileucinae is a subfamily of the family Saturniidae. It is also known as venomous caterpillars.

This subfamily contains the following genera:

Adetomeris Michener, 1949
Ancistrota Hübner, 1819
Arias Lemaire, 1995
Automerella Michener, 1949
Automerina Michener, 1949
Automeris Hübner, 1819
Automeropsis Lemaire, 1969
Callodirphia Michener, 1949
Catacantha Bouvier, 1930
Catharisa Jordan, 1911
Cerodirphia Michener, 1949
Cinommata Butler, 1882
Coloradia Blake, 1863
Dihirpa Draudt, 1929
Dirphia Hübner, 1819
Dirphiella Michener, 1949
Dirphiopsis Bouvier, 1928
Erythromeris Lemaire, 1969
Eubergia Bouvier, 1929
Eubergioides Michener, 1949
Eudyaria Dyar, 1898
Gamelia Hübner, 1819
Gamelioides Lemaire, 1988
Heliconisa Walker, 1855
Hemileuca Walker, 1855
Hidripa Draudt, 1929
Hirpida Draudt, 1929
Hispaniodirphia Lemaire, 1999
Hylesia Hübner, 1820
Hylesiopsis Bouvier, 1929
Hyperchiria Hübner, 1819
Hyperchirioides Lemaire, 1981
Hypermerina Lemaire, 1969
Ithomisa Oberthür, 1881
Kentroleuca Draudt, 1930
Leucanella Lemaire, 1969
Lonomia Walker, 1855
Meroleuca Packard, 1904
Meroleucoides Michener, 1949
Molippa Walker, 1855
Ormiscodes Blanchard, 1852
Paradirphia Michener, 1949
Periga Walker, 1855
Periphoba Hübner, [1820]
Polythysana Walker, 1855
Prohylesia Draudt, 1929
Pseudautomeris Lemaire, 1967
Pseudodirphia Bouvier, 1928
Rhodirphia Michener, 1949
Travassosula Michener, 1949
Xanthodirphia Michener, 1949

References

 
Saturniidae